Barmy Burgers is a 1983 video game written for the ZX Spectrum by Gary Capewell and Gary Sewell and published by Blaby Computer Games in the UK and Ventamatic in Spain. It is a clone of the 1982 arcade game BurgerTime.

Gameplay

The object of the game is to create three hamburgers by running over each of the ingredients, making them drop down levels until they make up complete burgers. Players must also avoid sausages and fried eggs who chase them down; players can stop them by firing pepper at them. However, if they catch the chef then the player will lose a life.

Reception
Crash praised the game for its sound and graphics, while Computer and Video Games said that "Barmy Burgers is a good game for any Spectrum-owning Burgertime fan."

References

External links

Dragon 32 games
ZX Spectrum games
1983 video games
Platform games
Video game clones
Video games about food and drink
Video games developed in the United Kingdom